Wyndham-Carseland Provincial Park  is a provincial park in Alberta, Canada, located  south of Strathmore and  south of Carseland, along Highway 24.

It was established on May 2, 1979, and is maintained by Alberta Environment and Parks.

It is home to a diverse selection of wildlife including timber wolves, beavers, moose, black bears, a large variety of birds, coyotes, mule deer, and grizzly bears. The Bow River from the Carseland Weir to the Highway 24 bridge holds a number of game fish species including brown and rainbow trout, northern pike and Rocky Mountain whitefish. Fishing regulations are enforced by Alberta Fish and Wildlife officers.

Wyndham-Carseland campground was affected by the June 2013 floods in Southern Alberta and was closed until 2015.

See also
List of provincial parks in Alberta
List of Canadian provincial parks
List of National Parks of Canada

References

External links
Wyndham Carseland Park

Provincial parks of Alberta
Vulcan County
Wheatland County, Alberta